The Magpie's Nest is an English fairy tale collected by Joseph Jacobs in English Fairy Tales.

Synopsis
All the birds came to the magpie, because it was the wisest, and asked it to teach them how to build nests.  The magpie started to demonstrate, but each time she did something, another bird concluded that was all there was to it.  By the time she was done, only the turtle-dove was left, and it had been paying no attention, but singing "Take two".  The magpie said that one was enough but looked up and saw that every bird had left.  She became angry and would not teach any more.

That is why birds build their nests differently.

External links
The Magpie's Nest

English fairy tales
Fictional birds
Joseph Jacobs